Ivan Yankov (born 7 June 1951) is a Bulgarian former wrestler who competed in the 1976 Summer Olympics and in the 1980 Summer Olympics.

References

1951 births
Living people
Olympic wrestlers of Bulgaria
Wrestlers at the 1976 Summer Olympics
Wrestlers at the 1980 Summer Olympics
Bulgarian male sport wrestlers
Olympic silver medalists for Bulgaria
Olympic medalists in wrestling
Sportspeople from Varna, Bulgaria
Medalists at the 1980 Summer Olympics
20th-century Bulgarian people
21st-century Bulgarian people